Leucorrhinia proxima, the belted whiteface or red-waisted whiteface, is a species of dragonfly in the family Libellulidae. It is found across Canada as far north as Alaska and south to northern parts of the United States.

References

Libellulidae
Insects described in 1890